Robert Archibald Wilton (31 July 1868 – 18 January 1925) was a British journalist, and a proponent of antisemitic thought and conspiracy theories in the United Kingdom.

Wilton, who was born in Cringleford, Norfolk, was the son of a British mining engineer employed in Russia. In 1889 he joined the European staff of the New York Herald, remaining with that newspaper for fourteen years, and corresponding on both Russian and German affairs. He then took up an appointment as The Times correspondent in St Petersburg, and became known as a keen observer of events in Russia during the last years of the Tsarist regime. After the Revolution, he moved to Siberia. Following the collapse of the Kolchak government, Wilton managed to escape from Russia and eventually arrived in Paris where, in 1920, he rejoined the New York Herald. In 1924 he joined the staff of a newly founded newspaper, the Paris Times (which published in English). He died from cancer at the Hertford British Hospital in Paris early in 1925.

Wilton served with the Russian army during the First World War, and was awarded the Cross of St George.

He was the author of two books: Russia's Agony (published by Edward Arnold, London, 1918) and The Last Days of the Romanovs (1920).

Аntisemitism
Wilton was a right wing antisemite.  He was a proponent of the theory of Jews involved in ritualistic murder, claiming in his 1920 book The Last Days of the Romanovs that the execution of the Romanovs was a ritual murder by the Jews.  He was criticized by several liberal British journalists for supporting the attempted military coup by Lavr Kornilov.  In 1919 he published "Russia's Agony", which claimed (p. ix) that "Bolshevism is not Russian - it is essentially non-national, its leaders being almost entirely in the league [Jews] that lost its country and its nationhood long ago". According to Semyon Reznik, Wilton was also assisting Russian antisemites in fabrication of photographic evidence of ritual crimes by Jews.

References

External links 
 Spartacus
 Russia's Agony by Robert Wilton.
 The Last Days of the Romanovs by Robert Wilton, George Gustav Telberg and Nikolai Sokolov.

Blood libel
British anti-communists
British male journalists
British people of the Russian Civil War
1868 births
1925 deaths
People from South Norfolk (district)